United States Marine Hospital may refer to

United States Marine Hospital in Louisville, Kentucky
United States Marine Hospital in Pittsburgh, Pennsylvania
United States Marine Hospital in Cincinnati, Ohio
United States Marine Hospital in Mobile, Alabama
United States Marine Hospital in Portland, Maine
United States Marine Hospital in Charleston, South Carolina

See also
List of U.S. Marine Hospitals